The short-tailed swift (Chaetura brachyura) is a bird in the Apodidae, or swift family.

Taxonomy

The species was first formally described as Acanthylis brachyura in 1846 by the Scottish naturalist  Sir William Jardine, based on the observations of Mr. Kirk, a resident of Tobago.

The genus name Chaetura is derived from the Greek khaite (hair) and oura (tail). The specific epithet brachyura is Greek for brakhus (short) and ouros (tailed).

Four subspecies are recognized:
 C. b. praevelox, found in Grenada, Saint Vincent, and Tobago
 C. b. brachyura, the nominate subspecies, found from Panama to Trinidad and the Guianas, south to west-central Brazil and northern Bolivia
 C. b. ocypetes, found in southwest Ecuador and northwest Peru
 C. b. cinereocauda, found in north-central Brazil

The subspecies C. b. ocypetes is sometimes considered a full species, the Tumbes swift Chaetura ocypetes Zimmer, 1953.

Distribution and habitat
The swift is a common resident of Trinidad, Tobago, Grenada and Saint Vincent, and in tropical South America from Panama, Colombia and the Guianas south to Ecuador, Peru and Brazil; in Brazil, the entire Amazon Basin, excluding much of the southeastern Basin. It rarely occurs over 800 m ASL even in the hottest parts of its range and in mountainous or hilly terrain it inhabits, but has been recorded as high as 1,300 m ASL.  It is found in a range of habitats including savanna, open woodland, and cultivation.

Description
The short-tailed swift is about 10.5 cm long, and weighs 20 g. It has long narrow wings, a robust body and a short tail. The sexes are similar. It is mainly black with a pale rump and tail. It can be distinguished from related species in its range, such as the band-rumped swift (C. spinicauda) or the gray-rumped swift (C. cinereiventris) by the lack of contrast between the rump and the tail, the latter being much darker in the other species.

Behaviour
It is very gregarious and forms communal roosts when not breeding. Predation by bats at the nest sites has been suspected.  The flight call is a rapid chittering sti-sti-stew-stew-stew.

Breeding
The nest is a 5 cm wide shallow half-saucer of twigs and saliva attached to a vertical surface. This is often a man-made structure like a chimney or manhole, as with its relative, the chimney swift (C. pelagica), but natural caves and tree cavities are also used.  Up to seven white eggs (average 3 or 4) are incubated by both parents for 17–18 days. The young leave the nest in a further two weeks, but remain near it, clinging to the cavity wall without flying, for another two weeks.

Feeding
The swift feeds in flight on flying insects, including winged ants and termites.

Footnotes

References
 Chantler, Phil & Driessens, Gerald (2000): Swifts: a guide to the swifts and treeswifts of the world. Pica Press, Mountfield, East Sussex. 
 Cuervo, Andrés M.; Hernández-Jaramillo, Alejandro; Cortés-Herrera, José Oswaldo & Laverde, Oscar (2007): Nuevos registros de aves en la parte alta de la Serranía de las Quinchas, Magdalena medio, Colombia [New bird records from the highlands of Serranía de las Quinchas, middle Magdalena valley, Colombia]. Ornitología Colombiana 5: 94-98 [Spanish with English abstract]. PDF fulltext
 ffrench, Richard; O'Neill, John Patton & Eckelberry, Don R. (1991): A guide to the birds of Trinidad and Tobago (2nd edition). Comstock Publishing, Ithaca, N.Y.. 
 Hilty, Steven L. (2003): Birds of Venezuela. Christopher Helm, London. 
 Laverde-R., Oscar; Stiles, F. Gary & Múnera-R., Claudia (2005): Nuevos registros e inventario de la avifauna de la Serranía de las Quinchas, un área importante para la conservación de las aves (AICA) en Colombia [New records and updated inventory of the avifauna of the Serranía de las Quinchas, an important bird area (IBA) in Colombia]. Caldasia 27(2): 247-265 [Spanish with English abstract]. PDF fulltext

External links
Photo; Article colombiacuriosa

short-tailed swift
Birds of Panama
Birds of Colombia
Birds of Venezuela
Birds of Ecuador
Birds of Brazil
Birds of the Amazon Basin
Birds of the Guianas
Birds of Grenada
Birds of Saint Vincent and the Grenadines
Birds of Trinidad and Tobago
short-tailed swift